Parade -Respective Tracks of Buck-Tick- is the first tribute album to Japanese rock band Buck-Tick, released on December 21, 2005. It collects cover versions of their songs by various artists.  It reflected the influence Buck-Tick had on younger generation musicians in Japan, and later in 2007, some of these artists performed at a festival dedicated to the band, which was released on DVD. The album reached number 14 on the Oricon chart.

A second tribute album titled Parade II -Respective Tracks of Buck-Tick- was released on July 7, 2012.

Track listing

References 

Buck-Tick albums
Tribute albums
Japanese-language compilation albums
2005 compilation albums